U2opia Mobile is a mobile technology company which has its headquarters in Singapore. The company’s product Fonetwish enables customers to receive real time updates from social networking sites such as Facebook, Twitter and Google on any handset without access to the internet. It also develops several social applications.

History 

U2opia Mobile was founded by Sumesh Menon and Ankit Nautiyal in 2010. In October 2017, U2opia Mobile launched Reycreo, a platform geared to help game discovery and adoption in frontier markets.

Operations 

U2opia Mobile currently has offices in Dubai, Gurgaon, and San Francisco along with their headquarters in Singapore. It has over 150 employees and was backed by the private equity investment firm Matrix Partners in 2011. It has partnered with telecom companies such as Bharti Airtel, Facebook and Twitter.

Products and services 

Fonetwish, the company’s main product, is a mobile application platform that works on the USSD protocol. It enables customers to access their Facebook or Twitter accounts from any location without having a 3G, EDGE or any other internet connection. Users can access their accounts by navigating through a textual, session-based interface. The service is popular in several countries in the Asian and African continents. The service is also available in Central and South American countries like Haiti, El Salvador and Bolivia. The versions of Facebook and Twitter are text only and do not have any photos or videos. The company also develops several social applications.

Growth 

The company currently has a customer base of 15 million and growing in over 33 countries since its founding in 2010.

References

Mobile technology